Baby Sitters Jitters is a 1951 short subject directed by Jules White starring American slapstick comedy team The Three Stooges (Moe Howard, Larry Fine and Shemp Howard). It is the 130th entry in the series released by Columbia Pictures starring the comedians, who released 190 shorts for the studio between 1934 and 1959.

Plot
The Stooges become babysitters when they are behind on their rent money. They are sent to babysit Junior Lloyd (David Windsor) whose mother, Joan Lloyd (Lynn Davis) is separated from her husband and is afraid that he might abduct Junior.

Moe tells Shemp to prepare some soup in the kitchen. Unfortunately, Shemp cannot read well and thinks soap is soup and proceeds to put it in the pan with other indigestible ingredients. They eat the soup and get sick while blowing out bubbles. The Stooges fall asleep and Junior is promptly kidnapped by his father.

The Stooges are awakened by Joan who notices that Junior is missing and that the door was open. She then sends the Stooges to her ex-husband's house to retrieve the baby. Amid the ensuing fracas, the Stooges' feet are crushed by a hammer-wielding Junior and they are smacked around by the husband. Eventually, Joan enters the apartment and she and her husband reconcile.

Cast
 Moe Howard as Moe
 Larry Fine as Larry
 Shemp Howard as Shemp
 Lynn Davis as Joan Lloyd
 David Windsor as Junior
 Myron Healey as George Lloyd
 Margie Liszt as Mrs. Crump

Production notes
Baby Sitters Jitters was filmed over four days on January 23–26, 1950.

When Junior hits Shemp in the foot with a ball-peen hammer, he hits his right foot, but as Shemp hobbles around in pain, he clutches his left foot.

References

External links
 
 
 Baby Sitters Jitters at threestooges.net
 Baby Sitters Jitters at Three Stooges Pictures

1951 films
Columbia Pictures short films
The Three Stooges films
American black-and-white films
Films directed by Jules White
1951 comedy films
American slapstick comedy films
1950s English-language films
1950s American films